The women's 200m freestyle events at the 2020 World Para Swimming European Championships were held at the Penteada Olympic Pools Complex.

Medalists

Results

S5

S14
Heat 1

Final

References

2020 World Para Swimming European Championships